2017–18 ABA League may refer to:
 2017–18 ABA League First Division
 2017–18 ABA League Second Division